The Ogden Raptors are an independent baseball team of the Pioneer League, which is not affiliated with Major League Baseball (MLB) but is an MLB Partner League. They are located in Ogden, Utah and play their home games at Lindquist Field.

Pitcher Ben Sheets, first baseman Prince Fielder, shortstop J. J. Hardy and third baseman Bill Hall formerly played for the Raptors. Hall of Famer Frank Robinson played for the Ogden Reds, a previous Ogden franchise in the Pioneer League. The Raptors' inaugural 1994 season is chronicled in the book Minor Players, Major Dreams (1997, University of Nebraska Press) by author-in-uniform Brett Mandel. 

During their second season of play, the Raptors set a league record for most runs scored in a single game, defeating the Helena Brewers 33–10 on August 27, 1995.

The official mascot of the Ogden Raptors minor league baseball team is Oggie. Oggie is a cartoon green raptor who wears the white home uniform with a "#" as the number. He is a regular part of Raptors' home games and events.

Before they arrived in Ogden, the team was known as the Pocatello Posse and played in Pocatello, Idaho.

On September 17, 2017, the Raptors beat the Great Falls Voyagers 8-3 to win their first ever Pioneer League championship.

In conjunction with a contraction of Minor League Baseball in 2021, the Pioneer League, of which the Raptors have been members since 1994, was converted from an MLB-affiliated Rookie Advanced league to an independent baseball league and granted status as an MLB Partner League, with Ogden continuing as members.

Playoffs
1996: Lost to Helena 2–0 in finals.
1998: Lost to Idaho Falls in semifinals.
2000: Lost to Idaho Falls 2–1 in semifinals.
2002: Lost to Provo 2–1 in semifinals.
2003: Lost to Provo 2–1 in semifinals.
2005: Lost to Orem 2–1 in semifinals.
2008: Lost to Orem 2–1 in semifinals.
2009: Lost to Orem 2–0 in semifinals.
2010: Defeated Orem 2–1 in semifinals; lost to Helena 2–0 in finals.
2011: Defeated Orem 2–1 in semifinals; lost to Great Falls 2–0 in finals.
2012: Defeated Grand Junction 2–1 in semifinals; lost to Missoula 2–1 in finals.
2014: Lost to Orem 2–1 in semifinals.
2016: Lost to Orem 2–1 in semifinals.
2017: Defeated Orem 2–0 in semifinals; defeated Great Falls 2–1 in finals.
2018: Lost to Grand Junction 2–1 in semifinals.
2019: Lost to Idaho Falls 2-1 in finals.
2020: All MiLB teams seasons were canceled due to COVID-19
2021: Lost to the Boise Hawks in Wild Card game.

Major League alumni

Mike Adams
Pedro Baez
Larry Barnes
Cody Bellinger
Chad Billingsley
Craig Breslow
Willie Calhoun
Marcos Carvajal
Alejandro De Aza
Blake DeWitt
Jose Dominguez
Scott Elbert
Nathan Eovaldi
Prince Fielder
Yimi Garcia
Dee Gordon
Javy Guerra
Bill Hall
J. J. Hardy
Corey Hart
Ben Hendrickson
Kenley Jansen
 Dean Kremer
Dave Krynzel
Russell Martin
James McDonald
Brad Nelson
Manny Parra
Xavier Paul
Joc Pederson
Justin Ruggiano
Carlos Santana
Corey Seager
Ben Sheets
Brock Stewart
Ross Stripling
Shawn Tolleson
Scott Van Slyke
Wesley Wright
Alex Verdugo
Edwin Rios

Roster

References

External links
 

Baseball teams established in 1994
Pioneer League (baseball) teams
Professional baseball teams in Utah
Sports in Ogden, Utah
Los Angeles Dodgers minor league affiliates
Milwaukee Brewers minor league affiliates